Major General William Antrobus Griesbach,  (January 3, 1878 – January 21, 1945) was a Canadian politician, decorated soldier, mayor of Edmonton, and member of the House of Commons and of the Senate.

Early life
Griesbach was born in Fort Qu'Appelle, North-West Territories, the son of Henry Arthur Griesbach, a North-West Mounted Police officer. Henry was on the NWMP's famous 1874 March West, finishing the march in Edmonton. In 1883, Henry was transferred to command Fort Saskatchewan; the family travelled on the Canadian Pacific Railway to Calgary and then by wagon train to Edmonton and Fort Saskatchewan, on occasion having to build or repair bridges in order to cross rivers.

William Griesbach left the rest of the family in 1891 in order to attend St. John's College in Winnipeg, from which he graduated in 1895.  Upon graduating, he returned to Edmonton and worked in a law firm for two years and in the Imperial Bank of Canada for one year, before returning to Fort Saskatchewan to work in a milling business for six months.  He returned to Edmonton to study law.

Boer War and legal career
Griesbach enlisted with the Canadian Mounted Rifles in 1899 to fight in the Second Boer War.  He knew from being weighed in at boxing tournaments that he fell short of the minimum  weight to enlist, so on his way to being weighed he surreptitiously grabbed a large piece of coal from the enlistment centre's coal box and held it behind his back while he stood on the scales.  During his service, he was awarded the Queen's South Africa Medal and received four bars.

Upon his return in 1901, he opened a law office of his own.  An Edmonton Bulletin article in 1927 quoted him as saying of these early years

Pre-war political career

Griesbach's first bid for political office took place in the 1903 Edmonton election, when he made an unsuccessful bid for election to Edmonton Town Council, placing fourth of nine candidates in an election in which the top three were elected.  He was more successful in the 1904 election when he was elected to a one-year term as an alderman to Edmonton's first city council placing eighth of seventeen candidates (in that first election as a city, Edmonton elected four aldermen to two year terms and four to one year terms, with the idea that four of the city's eight aldermen would be elected to two year terms each year).  He was re-elected to a two-year term in 1905, finishing first of ten candidates.

Previously that same year, he had run as a Conservative in the constituency of Edmonton in Alberta's first provincial election.  He was defeated by Liberal Charles Cross, and continued his service on city council.

Griesbach resigned as alderman one year into his term in order to run for mayor in the 1906 election.  He was victorious, collecting more than sixty percent of the vote in a three-person race and becoming, at twenty-eight years old, the youngest mayor in the city's history, before or since.  He served a one-year term, but did not seek re-election and stayed out of municipal politics thereafter.

He ran as a Conservative in the 1911 federal election, finishing second of three candidates in the riding of Edmonton (the victorious candidate was Liberal Frank Oliver).

Griesbach's final involvement in provincial politics came during the 1913 election, when he ran as a Conservative in Edmonton.  He finished fourth of five candidates, missing out on either of the city's two seats.

World War I
In 1906, Griesbach was commissioned as a lieutenant in the 19th Alberta Dragoons.  He was promoted to captain in 1907

When World War I broke out, the Dragoons volunteered as a unit.  In December of that year, Griesbach was promoted to major assigned to command the 49th Battalion.  He was able to recruit 1000 men in eight days in January 1915.  The unit served in various engagements, including the Battle of Vimy Ridge, the Battle of Arras, the Battle of Passchendaele, and the liberation of Mons.  In 1917, Griesbach was promoted to Brigadier-General and assigned command of the 1st Canadian Infantry Brigade of the 1st Canadian Division.

He was awarded the Distinguished Service Order twice and the Victorian Decoration for long service.  He was appointed Companion of the Order of the Bath and Companion of the Order of St. Michael and St. George.

During World War II, he was made Inspector General of the Canadian Army for Western Canada and was promoted to the rank of major-general. He retired from that position in 1943.

Federal Parliament
William Griesbach was elected to the House of Commons as a Government member for the riding of Edmonton West in the 1917 election, defeating incumbent Laurier Liberal Frank Oliver.  He served until September 15, 1921 (less than three months before the 1921 election), when he was appointed to the Senate, in which he served until his death.

Personal life, death, and legacy
Griesbach was an accomplished cyclist and played ice hockey and soccer for Edmonton teams.  He was a member of the Masonic Order, the Oddfellows, the Edmonton Veteran Association, the Canadian Club, and the Northern Alberta Pioneer and Old Timers' Association.

In 1906, he married Janet Scott McDonald Lauder.

William Antrobus Griesbach died in Edmonton on January 21, 1945, of a sudden heart attack.

CFB Griesbach, the Griesbach Garrison (part of CFB Edmonton), Griesbach Masonic Lodge, and Edmonton's Griesbach neighbourhood are named in his honour. Mount Griesbach in the Victoria Cross Ranges of Jasper National Park is also named in his honour.

References

External links

Edmonton Public Library biography of William Griesbach
City of Edmonton biography of William Griesbach
Real Estate Weekly biography of William Griesbach
William Antrobus Griesbach fonds at Library and Archives Canada
Report to the Edmonton City Council Executive Committee including a list of aldermen who have been honoured in the names of Edmonton's features
Generals of World War II

1878 births
1945 deaths
Canadian military personnel of the Second Boer War
Canadian generals of World War I
Canadian people of English descent
Canadian people of German descent
Canadian senators from Alberta
Canadian Companions of the Distinguished Service Order
Canadian Companions of the Order of St Michael and St George
Canadian Companions of the Order of the Bath
Edmonton city councillors
Conservative Party of Canada (1867–1942) MPs
Conservative Party of Canada (1867–1942) senators
Lawyers in Alberta
Mayors of Edmonton
Members of the House of Commons of Canada from Alberta
People from Fort Qu'Appelle
Progressive Conservative Association of Alberta candidates in Alberta provincial elections
Canadian King's Counsel
Canadian Army generals of World War II
Canadian Militia officers
20th-century Canadian politicians
19th Alberta Dragoons